was a 39-year-old unmarried Japanese woman, a senior economic researcher at the Tokyo Electric Power Company (TEPCO) moonlighting as a prostitute on the streets by night. She fell victim to murder by strangulation and rape by an unknown assailant in Harajuku, Shibuya on March 9, 1997, and after being reported missing from home by her mother, with whom she lived, her body was discovered on March 19, 1997 in a vacant apartment in the Maruyamachō neighborhood of Shibuya, Tokyo, where she engaged in her nightly activity. During the investigation it was discovered that she had kept a detailed journal of her many clients, including dates, times and fees.

Investigation
Govinda Prasad Mainali, one of several Nepalese roommates sharing an apartment unit in the adjoining building, soon became targeted by the Japanese authorities as the prime suspect. Although he was acquitted in the first trial from lack of conclusive evidence, he was subsequently convicted on appeal by the Tokyo High Court and given an indefinite prison sentence on December 22, 2000. Mainali went on to spend fifteen years in prison, until exculpatory sets of DNA evidence emerged linking an unidentified third man who had sexual and violent contact with the victim in the immediate hours before her death. Mainali was released in June 2012, and deported back to his native country, pending the retrial.

More than the murder case itself, the victim's lifestyle was sensationalized as the downfall of an elite careerist from a well-to-do family. Watanabe was an economics graduate of the prestigious Keio University, earning nearly US$100,000 from her regular job at the major utility firm. Her Tokyo University graduate father also worked for TEPCO as an engineer, until he died during her attendance at college.

In June 2012, the retrial was ordered by the Tokyo High Court in the face of new evidence that emerged the previous year. Swabs of semen recovered from inside the victim's body, which the prosecution claimed were too small a sample to analyze using existing technologies at the time, finally underwent DNA testing in July 2011, and ruled out Mainali as its source. The semen's DNA matched a piece of body hair (pubic hair) from the crime scene already established to be from an individual other than Mainali. The DNA was further matched to the blood stain on the Burberry coat the victim was wearing, and the saliva found on the victim's chest.  The saliva on her breast was already known to be of O type blood (Mainali is type B), and the prosecution knew it did not match Mainali, but did not present the evidence at trial, and withheld it from the defense attorneys until September 2011. Japan does not have an equivalent of Brady disclosure rules as in the US, which would have made failure to disclose salient evidence to the defense censurable as prosecutorial misconduct. In 2005, the Supreme Prosecutor's Office revised its Code of Criminal Procedure requiring prosecutors to present a list of evidence gathered. But the revised code carries no penalties for violations thus offering little deterrent to prosecutors who may choose to withhold evidence.

Mainali was released shortly after a retrial was granted, but was quickly deported to Nepal by Japanese immigration authorities for his previous visa violation.  In November 2012, he was formally acquitted of the crime.

In 2013 Mainali was awarded  ¥68 million as compensation for his wrongful imprisonment for fifteen years.

Literature
Noted nonfiction writer  wrote a bestselling book, Tokyo Electric Power Co. Office Lady Murder Case (pub. 2000) following this case. An appreciable segment of women in the workplace in Japan evidently identify with the victim's urge to "sell their bodies" as a reaction to difficult circumstances in their personal lives, dubbed "Yasuko syndrome", or Tōden OL shōkogun(i.e. TEPCO Office lady syndrome), the title of Sano's sequel (2001).

External links 
 Justice for Govinda Innocence Advocacy Group (Japanese)
 東電ＯＬ強盗殺人事件(松山大学法学部教授・田村譲のホームページ)(Japanese)

See also
 Grotesque, a novel by Natsuo Kirino
 List of solved missing person cases
 List of unsolved murders
 Tsuitōsha ("mourner"), a mystery novel by

Notes

References

1990s missing person cases
1997 murders in Japan
Female murder victims
Formerly missing people
Incidents of violence against women
Missing person cases in Japan
Unsolved murders in Japan
Violence against women in Japan